Maria Ilyinichna Ulyanova (Simbirsk – 12 June 1937, Moscow) was a Russian Bolshevik revolutionary, politician, and the younger sister of Vladimir Lenin and Anna Ulyanova.

Biography
Maria Ilyinichna Ulyanova was born on 6 February 1878 in Simbirsk and was the youngest child of Ilya Nikolaevich Ulyanov and his wife Maria Alexandrovna. She was given the nickname "Manyasha" by her family. She studied first at the Simbirsk gymnasium, in Simbirsk, graduating in 1893. In 1895, Maria applied to the physicochemical department of the mathematical faculty of the Higher (Bestuzhev) women's courses in St. Petersburg. However she was not accepted, and she had to enroll in 1896 for a two-year course in Moscow. After her graduation, she received a teaching diploma.

Since 1898, Maria had been a member of the Russian Social-Democratic Labour Party (RSDLP). She conducted propaganda in workers' circles, delivered illegal literature, and acted as a liaison officer. She was arrested several times. In September 1899, after the arrests of members of the Moscow RSDLP, Maria was sent under police supervision to Nizhny Novgorod.

On the night of March 1, 1901, Maria was arrested and placed in solitary confinement in the Taganskaya prison. After seven months she was deported to Samara. The third time she was arrested was in January 1904, and then having been released on bail in June of the same year, Maria left for Switzerland.

In 1905, Maria returned to St. Petersburg, where she worked as secretary of the Vasileostrovsky District Committee of the RSDLP.

On May 2, 1907, Maria was arrested again. Having been released in 1908, she moved to Moscow and worked in the Moscow Party organization.

In 1908-1909 Maria lived in Paris and studied at the Sorbonne, where she received a teaching diploma in French. In the summer of 1910, hiding from arrest, Maria worked as a home teacher in the village of Leppenino near the station Terijoki (Grand Duchy of Finland).

Maria was arrested again in May 1912, and was later deported to Vologda. From February to April 1915 in Moscow she studied at the Sisters of Mercy. In the summer of 1915 Maria went to the Western Front (Russian Empire) with a medical-nutrition detachment.

Since 1915, Maria was part of the Moscow organization of the RSDLP, corresponding with the Foreign Bureau of the Central Committee. After the February Revolution of 1917, she was co-opted into the Bureau of the Central Committee of the RSDLP.

Maria took an active part in the development of the Social Democratic and then the Communist press in Russia. From 1900 until 1917 she worked for Iskra, in 1917-1929 she was a member of the editorial board of Pravda.

Since 1903 - in the Secretariat of the Central Committee of the RSDLP. Member of the Bureau of the Central Committee of the RSDLP from 1917.

Maria was a member of the Central Control Commission of the CPSU from 1925 to 1934, a member of the Presidium of the CCC of the CPSU (1932-1934), then a member of the Soviet Control Commission under the SNK of the USSR from 1935.

In 1935, she was appointed to the Central Executive Committee of the Soviet Union.

Maria Ilinichna Ulyanova died on June 12, 1937 of heart disease in Moscow. The urn with her ashes in is buried in the Kremlin wall.

References

1878 births
1937 deaths
Soviet people of Jewish descent
People from Ulyanovsk
Russian Social Democratic Labour Party members
Communist Party of the Soviet Union members
Russian untitled nobility
Family of Vladimir Lenin
Revolutionaries from the Russian Empire